"The Old Dope Peddler" is a satirical song by Tom Lehrer.  It was on Lehrer's first album Songs by Tom Lehrer from 1953, and a new live recording on Tom Lehrer Revisited in 1960.

The song is a parody of a popular tune well known at the time titled "The Old Lamp-Lighter" by Charles Tobias and Nat Simon, a hit first for Kay Kyser in 1947, and continued to have popular new recordings to 1960. The verses of the original asserted that
"He made the night a little brighter
Wherever he would go
The old lamplighter
Of long, long ago"

It goes on to say that if there were sweethearts in the dark, "he'd pass the light and leave it dark," and concludes by explaining that now, the old lamplighter turns the stars on at night and turns them off at dawn.

Lehrer's parody switches the song's protagonist to "the Old Dope Peddler" selling "powdered happiness". 
It has lines like this:

 "He gives the kids free samples
 because he knows full well
 that today's young, innocent faces
 will be tomorrow's clientele"

The song was banned from broadcast by the BBC.

Lehrer's performance is sampled in the track "Dope Peddler" by U.S. rapper 2 Chainz on his 2012 album Based on a T.R.U. Story, and on UK electronica duo Akasha's track "Interzone (Tapping a Guitar with Beef on a Lonely Summer Day in Menlo Park)", remixed by Menlo Park on the 1999 album Cinematique - The Remixes.  The song was covered by Meat Puppets.

References

1953 songs
Songs written by Tom Lehrer
Musical parodies
Songs about drugs
Songs about occupations
Black comedy music
Satirical songs
Songs banned by the BBC